The 1905–06 Scottish Division Two was won by Leith Athletic with East Stirlingshire finishing bottom.

Due to expansion next season there are eighteen teams in Division One and twelve teams in Division Two. This meant Clyde and Hamilton Academical were promoted to the  Scottish First Division.

Table

References 

 Scottish Football Archive

Scottish Division Two seasons
2